Gregoria Ferrer (born 4 June 1963) is a Spanish sprinter. She competed in the women's 4 × 400 metres relay at the 1992 Summer Olympics.

References

1963 births
Living people
Athletes (track and field) at the 1992 Summer Olympics
Spanish female sprinters
Olympic athletes of Spain
Mediterranean Games bronze medalists for Spain
Mediterranean Games medalists in athletics
Sportspeople from Zaragoza
Athletes (track and field) at the 1991 Mediterranean Games
Olympic female sprinters